Signal is a 2016 South Korean fantasy police procedural television series starring Lee Je-hoon, Kim Hye-soo, and Cho Jin-woong. Based on the 2000 film Frequency in premise and inspired by real-life criminal incidents in Korea, including the Hwaseong serial murders, the series aired on tvN from January 22 to March 12, 2016 on Fridays and Saturdays at 20:30 KST for 16 episodes.

The series received widespread acclaim from audience and critics alike for its story and performances. It is also one of the highest-rated Korean dramas in cable television history with a peak audience viewership of 12.544%.

Storyline
Criminal profiler Park Hae-young (Lee Je-hoon) solves a kidnapping case involving a culprit who apparently disappeared after the crime with a mysterious walkie-talkie he picks up. The success of this case triggers the formation of a long-term cold case team, led by Det. Cha Soo-hyun (Kim Hye-soo), who has searched for her long-lost mentor, Det. Lee Jae-han (Cho Jin-woong), over the past 15 years. With the help of Jae-han, the person at the other end of the walkie-talkie, Hae-young solves other cold cases that had remained unsolved for years while also helping Jae-han help solve other cases. Unintended consequences due to the changes in the past follow.

Cast

Main
Lee Je-hoon as Park Hae-young
 The criminal profiler who finds the walkie-talkie by chance, and uses it to solve cold cases.
 Kim Hye-soo as Cha Soo-hyun
 The first woman police officer in the Special Task Force, she becomes the leader of the Seoul cold case squad.
 Cho Jin-woong as Lee Jae-han
 The somewhat clumsy and socially inept but incorruptible police officer from the past who establishes a rapport with Park.

Supporting
Police officers
 Jang Hyun-sung as Kim Bum-joo
 Police superintendent.
 Jung Hae-kyun as Ahn Chi-soo
 A senior detective who later becomes section chief of the Seoul cold case squad.
 Kim Won-hae as Kim Gye-chul
 Another officer from the violent crimes department who joins the Seoul cold case squad.
  as Oh Yoon-seo
 A colonel.
  as Jung Han-ki
 A forensic scientist and member of the Seoul cold case squad.
 Kim Min-kyu as Hwang Eui-kyung
 A junior officer that cleans up the Seoul cold case squad's work area.

Extended
 Kim Hyun-bin as young Park Hae-young
 Kang Chan-hee as Park Sun-woo
 Hae-young's older brother.
 Yang Dae-hyuk as Hong Won-seo
 A detective.
 Lee Moon-soo as Lee Jae-han's father
 Seo Ju-hee as Cha Soo-hyun's mother
 Lim Hwa-young as Cha Soo-hyun's younger sister
 Lee Do-yeop as Kim Jung-jae

Special appearances

 Oh Yeon-ah as Yoon Soo-ah (ep. 1-2)
 Lee Young-eun as Kim Yoon-jung (ep. 1-2)
 Lee Si-a as Kim Won-kyung (ep. 2-4)
 Kim Jung-young as Won-kyung's aunt (ep. 2-4)
 Kim Ki-cheon as Lee Chun-goo (ep. 3-4)
 Lee Dong-ha as Han Se-kyu (ep. 5-8)
 Jung Suk-yong as Oh Kyung-tae (ep. 5-7)
 Park Si-eun as Oh Eun-ji (ep. 5-6)
 Choi Woo-ri as Shin Yeo-jin (ep. 5-6)
 Yoo Ha-bok as Shin Dong-hoon (ep. 5-7)
 Son Hyun-joo as Jang Young-chul (ep. 7, 11, 14, 16)
 Lee Eun-woo as Shin Da-hye (ep. 7-8)
 Lee Sang-yeob as Kim Jin-woo (ep. 9-11)
 Lee Chae-kyung as Jin-woo's mother (ep. 10)
 Seo Eun-ah as Yoo Seung-yeon (ep. 10-11)
 Shin Yi-joon as Kang Hye-seung (young / ep. 11-14)
 Kim Woo-suk as Lee Dong-jin (ep. 12-14)
 Lee Jin-kwon as a bully (ep. 12)
 Hwang Seung-eon as Han Do-yeon (ep. 13)
 Jeon Su-ji as Kang Hye-seung (adult / ep. 13-14)
 Seo Ji-hoon as Jang Tae-jin (ep. 14)

Episodes

Original soundtrack

Reception
Upon its premiere, the series attracted attention for weaving actual cases into its plot and attained high ratings. With its finale rating of 12.54%, it is one of the highest rated Korean dramas in cable television history. It received praise for its solid acting, tightly-constructed plot and detailed and sophisticated direction; and enjoyed success internationally in China and Japan.

The drama went on to win several awards from different award-giving bodies, including Best Drama, Best Screenplay for Kim Eun-hee, and Best Actress for Kim Hye-soo at the 52nd Baeksang Arts Awards, as well as another Best Actress award for Kim and the Daesang (Grand Prize for Television) for Cho Jin-woong at the tvN10 Awards. Cho also won the Daesang at the 1st Asia Artist Awards for his performance.

Ratings

Awards and nominations

Adaptations
 A Japanese remake starring Kentaro Sakaguchi aired from April 10 to June 12, 2018 on Fuji TV.
 On October 23, 2019, Unknown Number, a Chinese remake of Signal, started airing on Tencent Video.

See also
Hwaseong serial murders
Miryang gang rape

References

External links
  
 

TVN (South Korean TV channel) television dramas
2016 South Korean television series debuts
2016 South Korean television series endings
Korean-language television shows
South Korean crime television series
South Korean fantasy television series
South Korean police procedural television series
South Korean television series remade in other languages
Television series about multiple time paths
South Korean time travel television series
Television shows written by Kim Eun-hee
Television series by AStory